The 1926 Racine Tornadoes season was their fourth and final season in the league and only season as the Tornadoes. The team failed to improve on their previous output of 4–3–3, winning only one game. They tied for sixteenth place in the league.

Schedule

Roster

Standings

References

Racine Tornadoes seasons
Racine Tornadoes
Racine Legion